Josip Globevnik is a Slovenian mathematician, born December 6, 1945 in Ljubljana, Slovenia (then Yugoslavia).

Globevnik graduated in 1968 and obtained his PhD in 1972 at the Faculty of Natural Sciences and Technology (FNT) of University of Ljubljana. He worked on the Faculty of Civil Engineering and Geodesy between 1969 and 1988, also as an associate professor (1978) and professor of mathematics (1983). From 1988 on he taught as a professor of mathematical analysis in the FNT and later the Faculty of Mathematics and Physics.

He taught as a guest on universities in the U.S. (1973/74, 1978/79, 1983–1985). For a shorter time, he visited several universities in Europe, Brazil and Israel.

Globevnik's main research interest is complex analysis. He published around 50 articles in international journals. From 1985 he has been a correspondence member and from 1989 a regular member of the Slovenian Academy of Sciences and Arts.

In 1976 he was awarded with Kidric Award.

External links
 

20th-century Slovenian mathematicians
Yugoslav mathematicians
21st-century Slovenian mathematicians
1945 births
Living people
University of Ljubljana alumni
Academic staff of the University of Ljubljana
Scientists from Ljubljana
Members of the Slovenian Academy of Sciences and Arts